Ralph Garman (born November 17, 1964) is an American actor, comedian, musician and radio host best known as the host of The Joe Schmo Show, for his voice work on the Fox animated series Family Guy, former entertainment reporter and impressionist for the Kevin and Bean morning show on Los Angeles radio station KROQ-FM, and his podcast with co-host Kevin Smith Hollywood Babble-On. Garman can currently be heard on his daily podcast, "The Ralph Report" on the Patreon platform.

Early life
Garman was born in Philadelphia, Pennsylvania, and graduated from Abraham Lincoln High School and then La Salle University with a Bachelor of Arts degree in communication arts.

Career
Garman was a regular reporter on the long-running Playboy TV series Sexcetera, which explored avant-garde sexuality in a lighthearted manner. He hosted The Joe Schmo Show, and was an entertainment reporter and impressionist for the Kevin and Bean morning show on Los Angeles radio station KROQ-FM. Garman was hired to work on the show through Jimmy Kimmel, at the time the sports reporter on the show, who had received a recommendation to hire him through former roommate Adam Carolla. His voice was heard over the radio by a Family Guy casting director, who requested him to audition for a part on Fox animated series.  He also hosts the Hollywood Babble-On podcast with Kevin Smith on SModcast.com where he utilizes various impressions in a series of ongoing segments that deliver news and satire centered around Hollywood, celebrities, and pop culture.

Garman's last Kevin and Bean show was suddenly announced on November 30, 2017. He was let go from his long-time position at KROQ due to downsizing by new management. On a wave of support from local, national, and international fans (accumulated from his work on both KROQ & Hollywood Babble-On) Garman has since launched his own new daily podcast called The Ralph Report with his 'vice' host Eddie Pence (named vice host since his last name is the same as the then US Vice President Mike Pence at the time the podcast was created.) The Ralph Report also features Steve Ashton as the U.K. Correspondent on Wednesdays and Fridays. This endeavor is made through Patreon. He now hosts this podcast full-time, as well as co-hosting Hollywood Babble-On. With Garman no longer tied to KROQ, Hollywood Babble-On has been freed up to tour more than it was able to in earlier years.

Comics
In 2014, Kevin Smith and Garman wrote a Batman '66 crossover featuring Batman and Green Hornet titled Batman 66 meets the Green Hornet.

Personal life
Garman married Kari Watson in April 2005. Watson gave birth to the couple's premature twins, Lincoln and Olivia, on March 26, 2010. Lincoln acquired an illness shortly after birth and died. Olivia remained in the neonatal intensive care unit for two months before coming home. Garman's mother died on November 13, 2012, from a sudden heart attack and kidney failure. On January 2, 2020, Garman announced on Twitter that his father had died of brain cancer earlier that morning. In March of that year, both on Twitter and during an episode #356 of the Hollywood Babble-On podcast (which Garman hosts with filmmaker Kevin Smith), he announced that he and his wife Kari were in the midst of a divorce, but that they were still on good terms. Their divorce was finalized later that year.

Filmography

Film

Television

References

External links

 
 SModcast Hollywood Babble-On Podcast Site
  'The Ralph Report'

1964 births
Living people
American infotainers
American podcasters
American radio personalities
American reporters and correspondents
American male film actors
American male television actors
American male voice actors
La Salle University alumni
Male actors from Philadelphia
Journalists from Pennsylvania
20th-century American journalists
American male journalists